Lampronia quinquepunctata is a moth of the family Incurvariidae. It is known from Nepal.

Description
The wingspan is about 14 mm.

Habitat
It has been collected in an area with scattered Acer and Rhododendron shrubs, but the immature stages and host plant are unknown.

References

Prodoxidae
Moths of Asia
Moths described in 1982